Laurence "Larry" Joseph Dorr (born September 18, 1953, in Boston) is an American botanist and plant collector. He specializes in the systematics of the order Malvales and the family Ericaceae.

Biography
In 1971 Dorr graduated from Roxbury Latin School and matriculated at Washington University in St. Louis. By his junior year, he took a break for a year, hiked the entire Appalachian Trail in five months, and then went plant collecting in British Columbia and Alaska. In 1976 he received a bachelor's degree in earth sciences and planetology from Washington University in St. Louis. In 1980 he received a master's degree in botany from the University of North Carolina at Chapel Hill. In 1983 he received a Ph.D. From University of Texas at Austin with dissertation "The Systematics and Evolution of the Genus Callirhoe (Malvaceae)".

He set up a program of research and exploration in Madagascar for the Missouri Botanical Garden from 1983 to 1986, was a lecturer in organismal biology at the University of Texas at Austin in 1987, and explored for plants in the northern Andes for the New York Botanical Garden from 1988 to 1991. At the Smithsonian Institution's National Museum of Natural History, he became in 1991 an associate curator in the botany department as an associate curator. There he works on systematic botany and floristic accounts of Malvales and Ericaceae, biocomplexity of flora of the northern Andes, and history of botanical investigation in Madagascar and neighboring islands, as well as natural history during the 19th century in the United States.

Dorr and his colleagues have done considerable work in improving the U.S. National Herbarium. He was from 1992 to 1996 editor-in-chief of the ASPT Newsletter. He has served on the editorial boards of BioLlania, BioScience, Brittonia, Flora Neotropica, and Taxon. He is the author or coauthor of over 100 scientific articles and has written or edited several books. Eleven plant species are named in his honor. His elder son often accompanied him on collecting expeditions.

Laurence J. Dorr married Lisa Ceryle Barnett in 1984. They have two sons.

Selected publications

Articles

Books

References

External links
 
 

1953 births
Living people
20th-century American botanists
21st-century American botanists
Plant collectors
Roxbury Latin School alumni
Washington University in St. Louis alumni
University of North Carolina at Chapel Hill alumni
University of Texas at Austin alumni
Smithsonian Institution people